Paradise City is an American musical drama television series created by Ash Avildsen for Amazon Prime Video. It is a continuation of Avildsen's 2017 film American Satan. The series premiered on March 25, 2021. A second season was announced in October 2021.

Production

Background 
In 2019, it was reported that a spin-off based on American Satan would be created, and that musicians Andy Biersack and Remington Leith would reprise their roles in the series. It also stars Bella Thorne, Ryan Hurst, and Cameron Boyce in his final role.

Development 
The first teaser was released on May 1, 2020. A trailer for the series was released in December 2020.

In an interview with TheWrap, director Avildsen stated that he hoped to begin filming the next season of the show before the end of 2021, but expressed concern over how to recast the late Boyce, who he felt was "the heartbeat for the audience."

Cast
 Andy Biersack as Johnny Faust, frontman of the Relentless
Remington Leith as Johnny's singing voice
 Ben Bruce as Leo Donovan, a member of the Relentless
 James Cassells as Dylan James, drummer for the Relentless
 Booboo Stewart as Vic Lakota, guitarist in the Relentless
 Bella Thorne as Lily Mayflower, bassist in the Relentless
 Mark Boone Junior as Elias Collins, owner of Akkadian Records
 Drea de Matteo as Maya, booking agent
 Ryan Hurst as Oliver Ostergaard
 Fairuza Balk as Lizzie Thomas, Vivian's mother, and Faith's grandmother
 Perrey Reeves as Natalie, Simon's mother
 Brooke Lyons as Capricorn
 Rhys Coiro as Adam Stone, the Relentless's manager
 Amanda Steele as Vivian Thomas, Faith's mother
 Olivia Culpo as Gretchen, Johnny Faust's girlfriend
 Cameron Boyce as Simon, son of Oliver and Natalie
 Hopsin as Gabriel
 Natalie Eva Marie as Jade, Lily's girlfriend
 Ned Bellamy as Ross
 Randy Blythe as Dom, leader of a veteran band called Over It All
 Sid Wilson as Fritz, a rapper
 Brittany Furlan as Janis Stone, Adam Stone's wife
 Nita Strauss as Val Wolfe
 Ash Avildsen as Levi Svengali
 Juliet Simms as Sheva, singer of the Mavens
 Matt Pinfield as himself
 Jim Ross as Ned
 Lenox Knight as Goth Vixen
 Kellin Quinn as Ralphie

Episodes

Reception 
Alexa Sutherland of Hollywood Insider praised the series' casting and portrayal of the rock and roll Los Angeles lifestyle.

References

External links 
 

2020s American drama television series
2021 American television series debuts
American musical television series
Amazon Prime Video original programming